Island Branch is an unincorporated community located  in Kanawha County, West Virginia, United States.

The community took its name from a small river island near the original town site.

References 

Unincorporated communities in West Virginia
Unincorporated communities in Kanawha County, West Virginia
Former populated places in West Virginia